Macrocoma bipartita is a species of leaf beetle of Morocco, described by Louis Kocher in 1962.

References

bipartita
Beetles of North Africa
Beetles described in 1962
Endemic fauna of Morocco